<onlyinclude>

January 2022

See also

References

killings by law enforcement officers
 01